The 1951 Men's World Weightlifting Championships were held in Palazzo del Ghiaccio, Milan, Italy from October 26 to October 28, 1951. There were 62 men in action from 14 nations.

Medal summary

Medal table

References
Results (Sport 123)
Weightlifting World Championships Seniors Statistics

External links
International Weightlifting Federation

World Weightlifting Championships
World Weightlifting Championships
International weightlifting competitions hosted by Italy
World Weightlifting Championships